Presidential elections were held in Chile in 1846. General Manuel Bulnes was the only candidate and elected unopposed.

Results

References

Presidential elections in Chile
Chile
1846 in Chile